The Autistic Gardener is a British documentary television series that first aired on Channel 4 on 8 July 2015. The series is presented by Alan Gardner, a gardener who has autism spectrum disorder, with help from his friend Anthony. Alan Gardner has won numerous awards at Chelsea, Hampton Court and Tatton Park.

Episodes

Series 1

Series 2

References

External links
 

Channel 4 documentaries
Gardening television
Makeover reality television series
2015 British television series debuts
2010s British documentary television series
Autism in television